Božo Kovačević (born 11 January 1955) is a Croatian politician and diplomat.

Kovačević was born in Pakrac and he graduated in sociology and philosophy at the Faculty of Philosophy, Zagreb.

Kovačević was one of the founders of the Croatian Social Liberal Party in 1989, and the  Liberal Party in 1998.

Kovačević was the Ambassador Extraordinary and Plenipotentiary of the Republic of Croatia to the Russian Federation from January 2004 to February 2009. He was the Minister of Environmental Protection and Physical Planning in the 7th and 8th Government of the Republic of Croatia, from January 2000 to July 2003.

See also 
 Embassy of Croatia in Moscow

References

1955 births
Living people
People from Pakrac
Representatives in the modern Croatian Parliament
Ambassadors of Croatia to Russia
Faculty of Humanities and Social Sciences, University of Zagreb alumni
Croatian Social Liberal Party politicians
Liberal Party (Croatia) politicians
Government ministers of Croatia
Party of Liberal Democrats politicians